Arroios is a freguesia (civil parish) and district of Lisbon, the capital of Portugal. Located in central Lisbon, Arroios is north of Santa Maria Maior and São Vicente, east of Santo António, south of Avenidas Novas and Areeiro, and west of Penha de França. The population in 2011 was 31,653.

History
This new parish was created with the 2012 Administrative Reform of Lisbon, merging the former parishes of Anjos, Pena and São Jorge de Arroios.

Landmarks
Bemposta Palace
Campo dos Mártires da Pátria
Lisbon Geographic Society
Queen D. Estefânia Square
Praça do Chile;
Praça do Duque de Saldanha.

References

Parishes of Lisbon